The 1983 Primera División de Fútbol Profesional season.  At the end of the regular season, the top 6 teams took part in Qualifying round, this was followed by a  final group stage. 
Aguila were named Champions after topping the final group stage

Teams

Managerial changes

During the season

League standings

Final round standings

Final round standings

Top scorers

List of foreign players in the league
This is a list of foreign players in 1983 Seasons. The following players:
have played at least one apetura game for the respective club.
have not been capped for the El Salvador national football team on any level, independently from the birthplace

Atletico Marte
 None

Agave
  

C.D. Águila 
  Ramirez
  Alejandro Glomba
  Rogelio Flores

Alianza F.C.
  

Chalatenango
  

FAS
  Manolo Alvarez

 (player released mid season)
  (player Injured mid season)
 Injury replacement player

Independiente
  

Luis Ángel Firpo
  

Once Lobos
  Byron Pérez 
  Óscar La “Coneja” Sánchez 
  Erwin Donis 
  Jorge La “Chana” Fernández

Santiagueño
  

UES
  Harry Ramon Bran

External links
 

1983
1983–84 in Salvadoran football